Vitice is a municipality and village in Kolín District in the Central Bohemian Region of the Czech Republic. It has about 1,100 inhabitants.

Administrative parts
Villages of Chotýš, Dobré Pole, Hřiby, Lipany and Močedník are administrative parts of Vitice.

References

Villages in Kolín District